Mexico is a predominantly Christian country, with adherents of Islam representing a small minority. Due to secular nature of the Mexico's constitution, Muslims are free to proselytize and build places of worship in the country. The country has a population of around 126 million as of 2020 census and according to the Pew Research Center, the Muslim population was 60,000 in 1990, 111,000 in 2010, and is predicted to be 126,000 in 2030; however, according to the 2010 National Institute of Statistics and Geography (INEGI) census, there were only 2,500 individuals who identified Islam as their religion. Most Muslims are foreign nationals and the majority are Sunni.

Organizations

Today, most Mexican Islamic organizations focus on grassroots missionary activities, which are most effective at the community level.

The Centro Cultural Islámico de México (CCIM), a Sunni organization headed by Omar Weston, a British-born Mexican convert to Islam, has been active in several big cities in northern and central Mexico. In the state of Morelos, the CCIM has built a prayer hall and centre for recreation, learning and conferences, called Dar as Salaam, which also operates Hotel Oasis, a hotel that offers halal holidays for Muslim travellers and accommodation for non-Muslims sympathetic to Islam. This group was the subject of a study carried out by British anthropologist Mark Lindley-Highfield of the Department of Anthropology at the University of Aberdeen. Apart from CCIM there is a branch of the Nur Ashki Jerrahi Sufi Order in Mexico City which is often at odds with the traditionalist Muslim community and is headed by two women, Shaykha Fatima Fariha and Shaykha Amina Teslima.

There is also a small Salafi organization (the Centro Salafi de México) led by Muhammad Abdullah Ruiz (a former deputy to Weston) and an educational centre managed mainly by Muslims from Egypt and the Middle East, el "Centro Educativo de la Comunidad Musulmana en México" (run by Said Louahabi),and centro al hikmah run by Isa Rojas a Mexican convert to Islam, who studied Islamic studies in the University of Medina, within the capital city. At first, the CCIM which headed by Muhammad Ruiz were closed, until it reopened in 1998 due to support from Saudi Arabia embassy, then from 2011 book which contained the claim by Muhammad Ruiz, he claimed that the active members in Mexico city are around 200 members, which half of it are Mexican converts. This number does not included the Sufis, Muslims from other organizations, and non practitioners.

Muhammad Ruiz Al Meksiki, general director of the Salafi Center of Mexico (CSM), estimates that in 2015, there are about 10,000 Muslims in Mexico.

Demographics

Islam represents less than 0.01% of the population.

Indigenous Mexican Muslims

The Spanish Murabitun community, the Comunidad Islámica en España, based in Granada in Spain, and one of its missionaries, Muhammad Nafia (formerly Aureliano Pérez), now emir of the Comunidad Islámica en México, arrived in the state of Chiapas shortly after the Zapatista uprising and established a commune in the city of San Cristóbal. The group, characterized as anti-capitalistic, entered an ideological pact with the socialist Zapatistas group. President Vicente Fox voiced concerns about the influence of the fundamentalism and possible connections to the Zapatistas and the Basque terrorist organization Euskadi Ta Askatasuna (ETA), but it appeared that converts had no interest in political extremism.  By 2015, many indigenous Mayans and more than 700 Tzotzils have converted to Islam. In San Cristóbal, the Murabitun established a pizzeria, a carpentry workshop and a Quranic school (madrasa) where children learned Arabic and prayed five times a day in the backroom of a residential building, and women in head scarves have become a common sight. Nowadays, most of the Mayan Muslims have left the Murabitun and established ties with the CCIM, now following the orthodox Sunni school of Islam. They built the Al-Kausar Mosque in San Cristobal de las Casas. Nevertheless, the vast majority of Native Mexicans today are non-Muslims.

Mosques

This is a list of some but by no means all mosques and Islamic meeting centers in Mexico.
 
 Centro Islámico del Norte. Av. Benito Juárez 603, Centro, 66230 San Pedro Garza García, N.L.
 Suraya Mosque in Torreon, Coahuila.
 Dar es Salaam Mosque in Tequesquitengo, Morelos.
 Tahaarah Mosque in Comitan, Chiapas.
 Al Kautsar Mosque in San Cristobal de las Casas, Chiapas.
 Al Medina Mosque in San Cristobal de las casas, Chiapas
 Musala Tlaxcala #30 San Critobal de las Casas, Chiapas
 Murabitun Mosque San Cristobal de las casa, Chiapas
 Salafi Mosque Muhammad ibn Abdul Wahab in Mexico City.
 Mezquita/ tekke de la Orden Jalveti Yerraji instituto Luz Sobre Luz in Mexico City.
 Masiid Omar, Centro Islamico Tijuana Beaches, Baja California, Mexico.
 Al-Hikmah Ciudad de México, Aragón, Mexico.
 Mezquita Euclides Euclides 25, Col. Anzures, Polanco, Ciudad de México.
 Mezquita de guadalajara Centauro 2912, La Calma, 45070 Zapopan, Jal. Guadalajara.
 Musalah Al Ajirah in Margarita # 5 local, colonia Santa Maria la Ribera, Delegación Cuauhtémoc, CP 06400, Mexico City.

Notable Mexican Muslims
Fitra Ismu Kusumo, Indonesian artist living in Mexico.

Moorish architecture in Mexico 

In Chiapa de Corzo, Chiapas, a fountain, known locally as "La Corona" or "La Pila" was built to provide the population with water. This architectural work was built in annealed brick with a strong Mudejar influence. It was built by the Spanish Dominican friars during the Colonial era in the sixteenth century.

The Morisco Kiosk (Moorish Kiosk) in Colonia Santa María la Ribera was made by José Ramón Ibarrola for the Universal Exhibition of New Orleans from 1884-1885, in the neo-Mudejar style that was prevailing in Spain in the 19th century.

See also

Religion in Mexico

References

External links
Centro Cultural Islamico de México, A.C. (Spanish)
Centro Educativo de la Comunidad Musulmana A.C (Spanish)

 
Mexico